Phyllostachys bambusoides, commonly called , giant timber bamboo, or Japanese timber bamboo, is a species of flowering plant in the bamboo subfamily of the grass family Poaceae, native to China, and possibly also to Japan.

Description
The culms are dark green, with a thin wall that thickens with maturity, and very straight, with long internodes and two distinctive rings at the node. The species is thin-skinned, easily split lengthwise, has long fibres, and is strong and highly flexible, even when split finely.

Leaves are dark green, and the sheaths are strong and hairless. New stalks emerge in late spring and grow at a rate of up to  a day; one specimen produced culms growing a remarkable  in 24 hours. The flowering interval of this species is very long, lasting roughly 120 years.

Uses
Its properties also make it useful in a number of traditional Japanese arts and crafts:

 Both  and Phyllostachys edulis (known in Japanese as ) are used in the making of  flutes
 The long internodes and equally long fibres of the bamboo make it ideal for traditional basket-weaving and the production of fans.

Phyllostachys bambusoides is cultivated as an ornamental plant in temperate zones worldwide, with numerous cultivars being available. Some grow to extreme lengths and heights, making them typically only suitable for parks and large gardens; however, more compact cultivars are available.

The following cultivars are recipients of the Royal Horticultural Society's Award of Garden Merit: 
'Castillonii' – yellow canes,  
'Holochrysa' – rich yellow canes,

Gallery

References

 Bamboo Garden
 Complete bamboo

External links
 * 

bambusoides
Flora of China
Flora of Japan
Flora of Korea